Abel Almarez (23 November 1941 – 23 May 2021) was an Argentine boxer. He competed in the men's bantamweight event at the 1964 Summer Olympics. At the 1964 Summer Olympics, he defeated Christopher Rafter of Ireland in the Round of 32, before losing to Chung Shin-cho of South Korea in the Round of 16.

References

External links

1941 births
2021 deaths
Argentine male boxers
Olympic boxers of Argentina
Boxers at the 1964 Summer Olympics
Boxers at the 1963 Pan American Games
Pan American Games gold medalists for Argentina
Pan American Games medalists in boxing
Bantamweight boxers
Medalists at the 1963 Pan American Games
Boxers from Buenos Aires